Oum Moung is an Angkorian temple in Laos, near Wat Phou.

It was built in the 13th or 14th century, probably as a resthouse for visitors to Wat Phou.

References

Angkorian sites in Laos